Sanjivreddy Bapurao Bodkurwar is a member of the 13th Maharashtra Legislative Assembly. He represents the Wani Assembly Constituency. He belongs to the Bharatiya Janata Party (BJP). Bodkurwar's victory was amongst the five seats won by the BJP, that resulted in the Indian National Congress (INC) not being able to win a single seat in Yavatmal district once its stronghold.

References

Maharashtra MLAs 2014–2019
Bharatiya Janata Party politicians from Maharashtra
Living people
People from Yavatmal district
Maharashtra politicians
Year of birth missing (living people)
Maharashtra MLAs 2019–2024